La Copa Junior (2005) (Spanish for "The Junior Cup") was a professional wrestling tournament produced and scripted by the Mexican wrestling promotion Consejo Mundial de Lucha Libre (CMLLl; Spanish "World Wrestling Council"). The tournament ran from January 28, 2005 to February 11, 2005 in Arena México in Mexico City, Mexico. CMLL's recurring La Copa Junior tournament featured second, third or fourth generation wrestlers completing against each other. The 2005 version of the La Copa Junior was the second tournament held by CMLL.

The La Copa Junior tournament did not return until 2005 when CMLL revived the concept and presented it as an annual recurring tournament. Héctor Garza was originally supposed to work the tournament, but was unable to return to Mexico due to commitments in the United States of America and had to be replaced by Apolo Dantés. Olímpico was unable to compete due to a neck injury, forcing CMLL to replace him with Máscara Mágica and the 1996 winner Emilio Charles Jr. had to pull out of the tournament due to a hand injury, he was replaced by Brazo de Oro. The tournament came down to Dr. Wagner Jr. and Shocker facing off in the finals, with Shocker winning the whole tournament.

Production

Background
Starting in 1996, the Mexican professional wrestling promotion Consejo Mundial de Lucha Libre ("World Wrestling Council"; CMLL) held their first ever La Copa Junior tournament. CMLL held the tournament to celebrate the fact that lucha libre in Mexico is often a family tradition, with a large number of second, third, or even fourth generation wrestlers following the footsteps of their relatives. The premise of the tournament is that all participants are second-generation or more, although at times the family relationship is a storylines family relationship and not an actual one. One example of this is Dragón Rojo Jr. being billed as the grandson of Dragón Rojo, when in reality that is simply a storyline created by CMLL. The original La Copa Junior was won by  Héctor Garza.

CMLL would not hold another La Copa Junior until the 2005 tournament (won by Shocker), followed by a 2006 tournament won by Dos Caras Jr. The tournament did not return until 2010, where Dragón Rojo Jr. won the 2010 version. In 2012, third-generation luchador La Sombra won the Junior cup

In 2014, CMLL held two La Copa Junior tournaments, first a tournament on January 1, won by Super Halcón Jr., followed by a VIP tournament, featuring higher card wrestlers than the usual tournaments, which was won by Máximo The semi-regular tournament returned in 2016, won by Esfinge In 2017, Soberano Jr. won the La Copa Junior Nuevos Valores

Storylines
The tournament featured a number of professional wrestling matches with different wrestlers involved in pre-existing scripted feuds, plots and storylines. Wrestlers were portrayed as either heels (referred to as rudos in Mexico, those that portray the "bad guys") or faces (técnicos in Mexico, the "good guy" characters) as they followed a series of tension-building events, which culminated in a wrestling match or series of matches.

Family relationship

Tournament

Brackets

Results

January 21

January 28

February 4

References

2005 in professional wrestling
2005 in Mexico
CMLL La Copa Junior
February 2005 events in Mexico